Ana Roces (born on February 2, 1976) is a Filipino actress. Roces was formerly a teen idol in the 1990s and a cast member of That's Entertainment.

Career
She was discovered in the Colgate commercial she appeared in opposite Eric Banes in the 1980s. Her first television appearance was in the Manilyn Reynes starer telenovela Gintong Kristal in GMA7. Then she  became a member of That’s Entertainment, Tuesday Group. 

She became a Regal contract artist and then transferred to Viva Films where she did over 20 movies. She starred in the 1992 comedy film Alabang Girls with Andrew E. She also starred in the film Oo Na, Sige Na (1994) as the partner of Robin Padilla's character and Kadenang Bulaklak (1994).

Personal life
Roces is the youngest child and only daughter (after two brothers) of Rene Adad, who was the Philippine branch manager of the Coca-Cola Export Company and a former president of the Philippine Football Federation, and Carmina Gutierrez-Adad. Roces is of Lebanese and Spanish descent.

Ana Roces has two children, Carmela and Mateo, and is married to Bertrand "Trandy" Baterina, a lawyer-politician from Ilocos Sur.

Filmography

Television
{| class="wikitable"
! Year !! Title !! Role !! Network
|-
| 2022 || Tadhana: Heredera || Marietta || GMA Network
|-
| 2019|| Sahaya || Irene Alvarez-Maglayao || GMA Network
|-
| 2019 || Ipaglaban Mo: Paasa  || Myla Serafin || ABS-CBN
|-
| rowspan=3|2018 || Pamilya Roces || Lily Renacia || rowspan=2 | GMA Network
|-
| Stories for the Soul: Tenement || Diday
|-
| Precious Hearts Romances Presents: Araw Gabi || Harriet De Alegre || rowspan=4 | ABS-CBN
|-
| 2017 || Ikaw Lang ang Iibigin || Sandra Reyes-Chan
|-
| 2016 || Maalaala Mo Kaya: Mikropono || Annie
|-
| 2015–2016 || FPJ's Ang Probinsyano || Nora Montano-Guzman
|-
| 2015 || Once Upon a Kiss || Daisy || GMA Network
|-
| rowspan=3 | 2014 ||  Maalaala Mo Kaya: Nurse Cap || Senior Nurse || rowspan=3 | ABS-CBN
|-
| Luv U || Jennifer Sevillamayor
|-
| The Singing Bee || Herself
|-
| rowspan=3 | 2013 || Anna Karenina || Daisy Manahan || GMA Network
|-
| Wansapanataym: Flores De Yayo || Flor || rowspan=4 | ABS-CBN
|-
|  Wansapanataym: Kilalang Kilala Ka Ba Niya? || Kathy
|-
| rowspan=3 | 2012 || A Beautiful Affair || Natalia Saavedra
|-
|  Maalaala Mo Kaya: Flash Cards || Guest
|-
| Alice Bungisngis and her Wonder Walis || Matilda Asuncion || GMA Network
|-
| 2009 || Your Song: Boystown || Glenda Santillian || ABS-CBN
|-
| rowspan=3 | 2008 || Codename: Asero || Ellen || GMA Network
|-
| Lovebook Presents: Break-up Diaries || Carla || TV5
|-
| E.S.P: The Haunt for a Ghost || Guest || rowspan=3 | GMA Network
|-
| 2007 || Impostora || Alexis Alvarado
|-
| rowspan=3 | 2006 || Makita Ka Lang Muli || Supporting Role
|-
| Komiks Presents: Da Adventures of Pedro Penduko || Guest || rowspan=2 | ABS-CBN
|-
| Calla Lily || Sari
|-
| 1999 || Beh Bote Nga || Maan || rowspan=1 | GMA Network
|-
| 1989 || Eat Bulaga! || Herself / Performer during the show’s 10th Anniversary Special that happened at the Araneta Coliseum. || rowspan=1 | ABS-CBN
|-
| 1988–1990 || That's Entertainment || Herself / Host at the Tuesday group || rowspan=1 | GMA Network
|}

FilmPakboys Takusa Viva Films (2020)The Girl in the Orange Dress as Nikki Villegas/Anna's Biological MotherHow to Be Yours as Anj's Sister (2016)Beauty in a Bottle as Joy Madamba (2014)For the First Time as Abby Villaraza (2008)Tiyanaks (2007)Bangers (1995)Matimbang Pa sa Dugo (1995)Abrakadabra (1994)Oo Na Sige Na (1994)Mistah (1994)Abel Morado: Ikaw ang May Sala (1993)Ikaw (1993)Kadenang Bulaklak (1993)Mahirap Maging Pogi (1992)Alabang Girls (1992)Pretty Boy (1992)Si Lucio at si Miguel: Hihintayin Kayo sa Langit (1992)Miss Na Miss Kita (Utol Kong Hoodlum II) (1992)Small and Terrible (1991)Shake, Rattle & Roll II (1990)I Have 3 Eggs (1990)Lessons in Love (1990)Katabi Ko'y Mamaw (1990)Regal Shocker: The Movie'' (1989)

See also
Viva Films
Arab settlement in the Philippines

References

External links

1976 births
Living people
ABS-CBN personalities
Filipino film actresses
Filipino people of Lebanese descent
GMA Network personalities
That's Entertainment Tuesday Group Members
Filipino television actresses